Sony BMG Music Entertainment v. Tenenbaum (1st Circuit Court) is the appeals lawsuit which followed the U.S. District Court case Sony BMG v. Tenenbaum, No. 07cv11446-NG (D. Mass. Dec. 7, 2009).

The initial district court decision awarded the plaintiffs $675,000 in statutory damages for Joel Tenenbaum's willful copyright infringement via peer-to-peer file-sharing of 30 songs. Tenenbaum then challenged the constitutionality of the damage award and asked for a retrial or a reduction of the award via common law remittitur. The district court judge rejected Tenenbaum's arguments in favor of a retrial, and declined to invoke remittitur because, in this case, it would prompt a retrial which would broach the constitutional issues remittitur was intended to avoid. Asserting that the question of the award's constitutionality was unavoidable, the judge reduced the damages to $67,500 on constitutional grounds, reasoning that the damages were effectively punitive, as well as excessive and in violation of Tenenbaum's Due Process rights.

Both parties then cross-appealed to the First Circuit Court of Appeals—Sony, et al., for full reinstatement of the original damages, and Tenenbaum challenging both liability and damages. The First Circuit rejected all of Tenenbaum's arguments, affirmed the denial of Tenenbaum's motion for a new trial, reversed the District Court's decision to reduce the damages, reinstated the original award, and remanded on the question of the common law remittitur.

Background 
Defendant and cross-appellant Joel Tenenbaum was an undergraduate student studying physics and mathematics at Goucher College in Maryland 2005 prior to the original litigation in the Massachusetts District Court. During this period, Joel Tenenbaum downloaded and distributed, via a peer-to-peer file-sharing network, a number of songs owned by the plaintiffs. 

While the plaintiffs are listed collectively as Sony BMG Music Entertainment, the plaintiffs in both the district court case and the subsequent appeal actually included five record companies:
 Sony BMG Music Entertainment
 Arista Records, LLC, a subsidiary of Sony BMG
 Warner Bros. Records, part of Warner Music Group
 Atlantic Recording Corporation, part of Warner Music Group
 UMG Recordings, Inc., part of Universal Music Group

As the plaintiffs are all members of the Recording Industry Association of America (RIAA), and it is the RIAA which makes public statements about the case, the case is sometimes informally referenced as RIAA v. Tenenbaum. However, references more commonly use Sony, Sony BMG, Sony BMG Music Entertainment, and the more precise Sony BMG Music Entertainment, et al. as the name of the plaintiffs.

During a jury trial in the Massachusetts District Court, Tenenbaum admitted liability for infringing the plaintiffs' copyright for 30 songs he downloaded and distributed via file-sharing software. The judge issued a directed verdict for the issue of liability, and the jury determined the infringement was "willful" and assessed statutory damages totaling $675,000.

Tenenbaum then filed a motion claiming the damage award was unconstitutional, and requested either a new trial or a reduction of the damages by remittitur. The Court granted the retrial request, in part, by considering the constitutionality and "punitive" nature of the damage award, weighing it against the standards established by the Supreme Court in the cases BMW of North America, Inc. v. Gore (referenced as BMW or Gore, and favored by the defendant) and in St. Louis, I.M. & S. Ry. Co. v. Williams (referenced as Williams, and favored by the plaintiffs and the U.S. Government). Citing these standards and other case law relating to statutory and punitive damages, the Court ordered the judgment in the case be amended to reduce the damage award by 90%, to $67,500.

Remittitur would allow the plaintiffs to reject the remitted award and opt for a retrial, which they had indicated they would do, so the Court explicitly chose to reduce the award on constitutional grounds, because a retrial would put the Court in the position of confronting the constitutional issues that remittitur was intended to avoid.

The plaintiffs and defendant collectively brought suit in the First District Court of Appeals to argue several matters:
 statutory damages and injunctive relief under the Copyright Act,
 constitutionality of the damages reduction
 matters of fair use
 a district court's ability to invoke constitutionality.

Facts 
Appearing before Chief Judge Lynch, and Circuit Judges Torruella and Thompson, the facts of the case are as follows:

The Massachusetts District Court entered judgement against Tenenbaum that he was liable for willful violation of the Copyright Act and summarily awarded Sony statutory damages of $22,500 for each infringed song. This reward is within the $750 to $150,000 per infringement that Congress established for willful infringement.

Tenenbaum then motioned for a new trial or remittitur. The district court skipped over the issue of the remittitur and instead reached a constitutional issue. Reasoning that the $675,000 fine is excessive and thus in violation of Tenenbaum's due process rights

Both parties then cross-appealed.

Tenenbaum's argument 
Joel Tenenbaum challenges the District Court's opinion that he is liable for copyright violation and he should owe Sony statutory damages. Tenenbaum challenges the constitutionality of the Copyright Act. In addition, he challenges the Copyright Act's statutory damages provision's applicability to his conduct. Tenenbaum also argues the district court committed various errors that require a new trial and that a further reduction of the damage award is required by the due process clause.

Sony BMG's argument 
Sony argues the district court has erred in reducing the jury's award of damages and seeks to reinstate of the full award of $675,000 and in its defense of Tenenbaum's willful infringement and liability of infringement.

Court decision 
Foremost in the circuit court ruling, the United States defended the constitutionality of the Copyright Act against Joel Tenenbaum's challenge. In addition, the United States contended the District Court of Massachusetts erred in bypassing the question of common law remittitur and thus should not have reduced Tenenbaum's punishment sum as a constitutional issue. 

The First Circuit court then moved to reject all of Tenenbaum's arguments. They point out that Tenenbaum has received multiple warnings from his parents, school, ISP, and the recording companies to cease and desist from his file-sharing and thus has willfully violated the Copyright Act and infringed the Copyrights of Sony et al. by using the peer-to-peer sharing platform Kazaa. In addition, the court affirmed the denial of Tenenbaum's motion for a new trial or remittitur on the claim that the Copyright Act is not applicable to his actions or trial. Lastly, the court reversed the District Court's supplemental decision to reduce the damages Tenenbaum owed Sony et al., and instead reinstated the original full value of $675,000.

On February 13, 2012, Tenenbaum petitioned the United States Supreme Court to review the case.  The court denied the petition on May 21.

Aftermath 
Although the First Circuit Court, in its opinion, recommends Congress to reanalyze its copyright laws, the United States Supreme Court has yet to weigh in with its opinion. As such, the current legal precedents and legal situation for the states in the First District are as follows:
 The Copyright Act is constitutional.
 The Copyright Act is applicable for cases of peer-to-peer file sharing of copyrighted material by individuals.
 Peer-to-peer file sharing of copyrighted works by individuals for the purpose of "enjoyment" is not fair use.
 Skipping common law remittitur and instead applying for constitutional reasoning is erroneous.
 Courts must practice constitutional avoidance: the practice of first arguing or reasoning a point based upon common law before turning to use the constitution.

Bibliography for (Sony BMG Music Entertainment v. Tenenbaum (1st Cir. 2011) 
 Mass. District Court Opinion 
 Mass. District court opinion 
 Rhode Island district court memorandum 
 First district court of appeals opinion 
 First district court of appeals supplement 
 First district court of appeals documentation 
 Collection of industry versus people files 
 Random summary article on 1st district court decision 
 US Court PDF 
 DMCA
 Joel Tenenbaum and lawyers website 
 Copyhype article 
Rights of copyright owner
Definitions
Damages

References

United States file sharing case law
United States copyright case law
2011 in United States case law
Sony litigation
Sony BMG
United States Court of Appeals for the First Circuit cases